Birkeniiformes (Birkeniida or Birkeniids) is an extinct order of jawless fish belonging to the class Anaspida.

Subtaxa 
A newer taxonomy based on the work of Mikko's Phylogeny Archive, Nelson, Grande and Wilson 2016 and van der Laan 2018.

 Genus †Cowielepis Blom 2008
 Genus †Hoburgilepis Blom, Märss & Miller 2002
 Genus †Kerreralepis Blom 2012
 Genus †Maurylepis Blom, Märss & Miller 2002
 Genus †Rytidolepis Pander 1856
 Genus †Schidiosteus Pander 1856
 Genus †Silmalepis Blom, Märss & Miller 2002
 Genus †Vesikulepis Blom, Märss & Miller 2002
 Family †Pharyngolepididae Kiær 1924 corrig.
 Genus †Pharyngolepis Kiaer 1911
 Family †Pterygolepididae Obručhev 1964 corrig.
 Genus †Pterygolepis Cossmann 1920 [Pterolepis Kiaer 1911 non Rambur 1838 non De Candolle ex Miquel 1840; Pterolepidops Fowler 1947] 
 Family †Rhyncholepididae Kiær 1924 corrig.
 Genus †Rhyncholepis Kiær 1911 non Miquel 1843 non Nuttall 1841
 Family †Tahulalepididae Blom, Märss & Miller 2002
 Genus †Tahulalepis Blom, Märss & Miller 2002
 Genus †Trimpleylepis Miller, Märss & Blom 2004
 Family †Lasaniidae Goodrich 1909
 Genus †Lasanius Traquair 1898
 Family †Ramsaasalepididae Blom, Märss & Miller 2003
 Genus †Ramsaasalepis Blom, Märss & Miller 2003
 Family †Birkeniidae Traquair 1899
 Genus ?†Vilkitskilepis Märss 2002
 Genus †Ctenopleuron Matthew 1907
 Genus †Saarolepis Robertson 1945 [Anaspis Robertson 1941 non Geoffroy 1762 non Thomson 1893]
 Genus †Birkenia Traquair 1898
 Family †Septentrioniidae Blom, Märss & Miller 2002
 Genus †Liivilepis Blom, Märss & Miller 2002
 Genus †Manbrookia Blom, Märss & Miller 2002
 Genus †Ruhnulepis Blom, Märss & Miller 2002
 Genus †Spokoinolepis Blom, Märss & Miller 2002
 Genus †Septentrionia Blom, Märss & Miller 2002

References 

 System der rezenten und fossilen Fischartigen und Fische. LS Berg, 1958

External links 
 

 
Prehistoric jawless fish orders